The Military governor of Paris is a post within the French Army. He commands the garrison of Paris and represents all the military based in Paris at high state occasions. He is also responsible (subordinate to the President of France) for organizing major national ceremonies such as the Bastille Day military parade down the Champs-Élysées.

The foundation of the post is blurred, but it has subsequently evolved in two phases. Under the Ancien Régime, its role was limited in comparison to his colleagues in the provinces, who represented the King of France in his absence, whereas in Paris the King was present. The post was dispensed with at the time of the French Revolution before being re-established by Napoleon in 1804, when it was reinforced by becoming a military-command role.

List of governors

Governors of Paris under the Ancien Régime 

 Louis I d'Anjou: 1356–1357
 Jean de Berry: 1411
 Waléran III de Luxembourg: 1411–1413
 Jean II de Luxembourg: 1418–1420
 Marshal Jean de La Baume: 1422–142.
 Jean de Villiers: 1429–14..
 Philippe de Ternant: 14..–14..
 Jacques de Villiers: 1461
 Charles d'Artois, Count of Eu: 1465
 Charles de Melun, Baron of the Landes and of Normanville: 1465–1467
 Charles I d'Amboise, Count of Brienne: 1467–1470
 Charles de Gaucourt, Viscount of Aix: 14..–1472
 Antoine de Chabannes, Count of Dammartin: 1472–147.
 Guillaume de Poitiers: 1478–14..
 Louis d'Orléans: 1483–1485
 Antoine de Chabannes, Count of Dammartin: 1485–1488
 Gilbert de Montpensier: 14..–1494
 Charles II d'Amboise: 1493–1496
 Antoine de La Rochefoucauld, Lord of Barbezieux: 15..–15..
 Marshal Paul de Thermes: 1559–1562
 Marshal Charles de Cossé: 1562–1563
 Marshal François de Montmorency: 15..–1572
 René de Villequier, Viscount of La Guerche: 1580
 François d'O: 158.–1589
 Charles-Emmanuel de Savoie: 1589–1590
 Jean-Francois de Faudoas: 1590–1594
 Charles II de Cossé, Marshal of the league: 1594
 François d'O: 1594
 Charles du Plessis: 1616
 Hercule de Rohan, Duke of Montbazon: 1643–16..
 Marshal François de L'Hospital: 1648–1657
 Maréchal de Camp Ambroise-François de Bournonville: 1657–1662
 Marshal Antoine d'Aumont, Marquis of Villequier: 1662–1669
 Gabriel de Rochechouart, Duke of Mortemart: 1669–1675
 Charles III de Créquy, Duke of Poix: 1676–1687
 Léon Potier, Duke of Gesvres: 1687–1704
 Duc de Tresmes: 1704–1739
 Bernard Potier, Duke of Gesvres: 1739–1757
 Charles Louis d'Albert, Duke of Chevreuse and of Luynes: 1757–1771
 Marshal Jean de Cossé-Brissac: 1771–1780
 Maréchal de Camp Louis de Cossé-Brissac: 1780–1791

General commanders of the Armed Forces in Paris 

 General Louis d'Affry: 1791–1792
 General Jacques-François de Menou: 1792–1794
 General Jean Thierry: 1794–1795
 General Jacques-François de Menou: 1795
 General Paul de Barras: 1795
 General Napoléon Bonaparte: 1795–1796
 General Jacques Maurice Hatry: 1796–1797
 General Pierre Augereau: 1797
 General Louis Lemoine: 1797
 General Jean-François Moulin: 1797–1798
 General Joseph Gilot: 1798–1799
 General Barthélemy Catherine Joubert: 1799
 General Jean-Antoine Marbot: 1799
 General François Joseph Lefebvre: 1799–1800
 General Édouard Mortier: 1800–1803
 General Jean-Andoche Junot: 1803–1804

Military governors of Paris after the French Revolution 

 General Joachim Murat: 1804–1805
 Prince Louis Bonaparte: 1805–1806
 Marshal Joachim Murat: 1806
 General Jean-Andoche Junot: 1806–1807
 General Pierre-Augustin Hulin: 1807–1814
 General Louis de Rochechouart: 1814
 General Louis Sébastien Grundler: May 1814–January 1815
 General Nicolas-Joseph Maison: 1815
 General Pierre-Augustin Hulin: 1815 (Hundred Days)
 Marshal André Masséna: July 1815
 General Nicolas-Joseph Maison: July–September 1815
 General Hyacinthe Despinoy: 1815–1816
 Marshal Catherine Dominique de Pérignon: 1816–1818
 General Nicolas-Joseph Maison: 1819–1821
 Marshal Auguste de Marmont: 1821–1830
 General Pierre-Claude Pajol: 1830–1842
 General Tiburce Sébastiani: 1842–1848
 General Nicolas Changarnier: 1848–1851
 General Achille Baraguey d'Hilliers: 1851
 Marshal Bernard Pierre Magnan: 1851–1865
 Marshal François Certain de Canrobert: 1865–1870
 Marshal Achille Baraguey d'Hilliers: 1870
 General Louis-Jules Trochu: 1870–1871
 General Joseph Vinoy: 1871
 General Paul de Ladmirault: 1871–1878
 General Édouard Aymard: 1878–1880
 General Justin Clinchant: 1880–1881
 General Alphonse-Théodore Lecointe: 1882–1884
 Divisional general Félix-Gustave Saussier: 1884–1898
 General Émile Zurlinden: 1898–1899
 General Joseph Brugère: 1899–1900
 Divisional general Georges-Auguste Florentin: 1900–1901
 General Paul-Vincent Faure-Biguet: 1901–1903
 General Jean Dessirier: 1903–1906
 General Jean-Baptiste Dalstein: 1906–1910
 General Michel-Joseph Maunoury: 1910–1912
 General Victor-Constant Michel: 1912–1914
 Général de division Joseph Gallieni: 1914–1915
 General Michel-Joseph Maunoury: 1915–1916
 General Augustin Dubail: 1916–1918
 General Adolphe Guillaumat: 1918
 General Charles Emile Moinier: 1918–1919
 General Pierre Berdoulat: 1919–1923
 General Henri Gouraud: 1923–1937
 General Gaston Billotte: 1937–1939
 General Pierre Héring: 1939–1940
 General Henri Dentz: June 1940

Military governors of Paris under the German occupation 
Under the German occupation of France, Paris had at least three German military governors:

 General Otto von Stülpnagel
 General Carl-Heinrich von Stülpnagel, cousin of the former
 General Dietrich von Choltitz

Military governors of Paris since 1944 

 General Philippe Leclerc: 1944
 General Marie-Pierre Kœnig: 1944–1945
 General Paul Legentilhomme: 1945–1947
 Army general René Chouteau: 16 January 1947–March 1953
 Army general Henri Zeller: 1953–1957
 General Louis-Constant Morlière: 1957–1958
 General Pierre Garbay: 1958–1959
 General Raoul Salan: 1959–1960
 Army general Maurice Gazin: 1960
 Army general André Demetz: 1960–1962
 General Louis Dodelier: 1962–1965
 General Philippe de Camas: 1965–1968
 General André Meltz: 1968–1971
 Army general Bernard Usureau: 1971–1974
 Army corps general Philippe Clave: 1974–1975
 General Jean Favreau: 1975–1977
 Army corps general Jacques de Barry: 1977–1980
 Army general Jeannou Lacaze: 15 September 1980–1981
 Army corps general Roger Périer: 1981–1982
 Army general Alban Barthez: 1 September 1982
 Army corps general Michel Fennebresque: 1984
 Army general Hervé Navereau: 14 March 1987
 Army general Daniel Valéry: 1 September 1991
 Army general Michel Guignon: 1 August 1992
 Army corps general Michel Billot: 28 October 1996
 Army general Pierre Costedoat: 1 August 2000
 Army general Marcel Valentin: 1 November 2002
 Army corps general Xavier de Zuchowicz: 1 August 2005
 Army general Bruno Dary: 1 August 2007
 Army general Hervé Charpentier: 1 August 2012
 Army corps general Bruno Le Ray: 31 July 2015
 Army corps general Christophe Abad: 31 July 2020

See also 
 Governor of Les Invalides

Citations

Bibliography
 Colonel Gérard Bieuville, sous-lieutenant Pierre Perrier, Les Gouverneurs militaires de Paris, Connaissances et mémoires européennes, Gouvernement militaire de Paris, 1999.
 Tulard, Jean. Murat: Du maréchal d'Empire au roi de Naples. Paris: Marabout, 1983.

External links 
 Règlement du service de garnison